Tom van Bergen (born 9 September 1981) is a Dutch former professional footballer who played as a defender or midfielder.

Career
Van Bergen started his career with Dutch second tier side VVV-Venlo, where he made 46 league appearances and scored 1 goal. On 19 April 2002, van Bergen debuted for VVV-Venlo during a 2–1 win over SC Cambuur. On 16 April 2004, he scored his first goal for VVV-Venlo during a 4–2 win over Go Ahead Eagles. In 2007, van Bergen signed for Al Riffa in Bahrain. After that, he signed for Dutch sixth-tier club SV Venray. In 2016, he signed for Union Nettetal in the German sixth tier.

References

External links
 

Living people
1981 births
Dutch footballers
Association football midfielders
Association football defenders
Eerste Divisie players
MVV Maastricht players
VVV-Venlo players
Riffa SC players
SV 19 Straelen players
Dutch expatriate footballers
Dutch expatriate sportspeople in Bahrain
Expatriate footballers in Bahrain
Dutch expatriate sportspeople in Germany
Expatriate footballers in Germany